Campo das Vertentes is one of the twelve mesoregions of the Brazilian state of Minas Gerais. It is composed of 36 municipalities, distributed across 3 microregions.

References 

Campo das Vertentes